Duke Tai of Tian Qi (died 384 BC) was from 386 to 384 BC ruler of the State of Qi, a major power during the Warring States period of ancient China.  He was the first Qi ruler from the House of Tian, replacing the House of Jiang that had ruled the state for over six centuries.

Duke Tai's personal name was Tian He (田和), and ancestral name Gui (媯).  His official posthumous title was simply Duke Tai of Qi, but he is commonly called Duke Tai of Tian Qi or Duke Tai of Tian to be distinguished from Jiang Ziya, the original Duke Tai from the House of Jiang, who founded Qi in the 11th century BC.

Reign
Since Tian He's great-grandfather Tian Heng killed Duke Jian of Qi in 481 BC, the leaders of the Tian clan had been the de facto rulers of Qi.  In 404 BC Tian He succeeded his older brother Tian Daozi as head of the Tian clan.  He nominally served under Duke Kang of Qi, the last ruler from the House of Jiang, but effectively ruled the state himself.

Tian He asked Marquis Wu of Wei to lobby for him at the court of King An of Zhou, the nominal ruler of all China.  In 386 BC, King An officially recognized Tian He as ruler of Qi, ending more than six centuries of rule by the House of Jiang.  Tian He became the first de jure ruler of Qi from the House of Tian, and is posthumously known as Duke Tai of Qi.  He subsequently exiled Duke Kang to a seaside city, where Duke Kang lived for seven more years and died in 379 BC.

Duke Tai died in 384 BC, just two years after formally ascending the throne.  He was succeeded by his son Tian Yan, who would later be killed by Duke Tai's younger son Tian Wu, Duke Huan of Tian Qi.

Mausoleum
Duke Tai's mausoleum is located near the village of Chengjiagou (程家沟) in Putong Township (普通乡) of Qingzhou, Shandong Province. The seven known mausoleums of Tian Qi rulers are now protected as a National Historical and Cultural Site. Since 2008 they have been included in the tentative list of UNESCO World Heritage Sites as part of the ancient Qi capital and mausoleum complex.

Family
Wives:
 Lady (d. 364 BC), the mother of Prince Yan

Concubines:
 Consort Xiao, the mother of Prince Wu

Sons:
 Prince Yan (d. 375 BC), ruled as the Duke of Qi from 383–375 BC
 Prince Wu (400–357 BC), ruled as Duke Huan of Tian Qi from 374–357 BC

Ancestry

References

Year of birth unknown
Monarchs of Qi (state)
4th-century BC Chinese monarchs
384 BC deaths
Founding monarchs